This article is about the particular significance of the decade 1730 - 1739 to Wales and its people.

Incumbents
Prince of Wales - Frederick 
Princess of Wales - Augusta (from 17 April 1736)

Events
1730
1731
1732
1733
1734
1735
1736
1737
1738
1739

Arts and literature

New books
1730
Joseph Harris - A Treatise on Navigation
James Lewis & Christmas Samuel - Y Cyfrif Cywiraf o'r Pechod Gwreiddiol
William Wotton (ed.) - Cyfreithjeu Hywel Dda ac eraill, seu Leges Wallicae (Laws of Hywel Dda) 
1731
Humphrey Lhuyd - Britannicae Descriptionis Commentariolum
Edward Samuel - Athrawiaeth yr Eglwys
1732
David Evans - The Minister of Christ and his Flock
Jeremy Owen - Golwg ar y Beiau
1734
Edmund Curll - The Life of Robert Price … one of the Justices of His Majesty's Court of Common-Pleas

Music

Births
1731
date unknown - Siôn Robert Lewis, author and hymn-writer (d. 1806)
1732
5 October - Lloyd Kenyon, 1st Baron Kenyon, lawyer and politician (d. 1802)
1734
3 July - Henry Herbert, 10th Earl of Pembroke (d. 1794)
24 October - Thomas Henry, apothecary (d. 1816)
1736
date unknown - Thomas Wynn, 1st Baron Newborough, politician (d. 1807)
1737
13 May - Thomas Williams of Llanidan, industrialist (d. 1802)
31 August - Princess Augusta, eldest child of the Prince and Princess of Wales (d. 1813)
date unknown - Richard Pennant, 1st Baron Penrhyn, politician and slave-owner (d. 1808)
1738
4 June - Prince George, eldest son of the Prince and Princess of Wales (d. 1820)
date unknown - David Williams, philosopher (d. 1816)
1739
14 March - Prince Edward, Duke of York and Albany, second son and third child of the Prince and Princess of Wales (d. 1767)
date unknown
Richard Crawshay, industrialist (d. 1810)
Thomas Edwards (Twm o'r Nant), dramatist and poet (d. 1810)

Deaths
1730
August - Sir William Glynne, 5th Baronet, 21
December - Owen Gruffydd, poet
date unknown - Thomas Trevor, 1st Baron Trevor, politician
1731
6 April - David Lloyd, Welsh-born American lawyer
September - Rowland Ellis, Quaker leader (in America)
1732
2 February - Robert Price, judge, 79
1733
22 January - Thomas Herbert, 8th Earl of Pembroke
date unknown
John Morgan, poet
Sir Robert Myddelton, 5th Baronet
John Myddelton of Chirk Castle, politician
1734
2 June - Francis Gwyn, politician, 85?
14 June - John Hanbury, industrialist, 70?
13 July - Ellis Wynne, clergyman and writer, 63
1737
14 February - Charles Talbot, 1st Baron Talbot, 52
20 November - Caroline of Brandenburg-Ansbach, consort of King George II of Great Britain and former Princess of Wales (1714-1727), 54
date unknown - Guto Nyth Brân, legendary athlete, 37
1738
27 September - Sir Thomas Stradling, 28 (in a duel)
1739
5 May - Sir Roger Mostyn, 3rd Baronet, 65

References

 
18th century in Wales
Wales
Wales
Decades in Wales